"Conversations avec J. M. G. Le Clézio" are the written dialogues in French of Pierre Lhoste interviewing French Nobel Prize in Literature J. M. G. Le Clézio on September 2,1969 and from January 11 until January 16, 1971. The introduction was written by J. M. G. Le Clézio.

Publication history
 At head of title: Pierre Lhoste."Entretiens ... diffusés sur la chaîne de France-Culture les 30 août et 2 septembre 1969 et du 11 au 16 janvier 1971."

References

Works by J. M. G. Le Clézio